Artificial Intelligent Football GGO, also known as GGO Football, is a Chinese animation television series produced by Puzzle Animation Studio Ltd. The story centers on high schooler Isaac and his friends as they compete in advanced robotic football tournament.

It aired on CCTV, China, in July 2010 during World Cup, before then got distributed by Asia Animation Ltd. to Asia, Europe, Australia, and America. Before the 2010 World Cup started, however, the English dub for AI Football GGO first aired on E.tv, South Africa, between June 2, 2010, to June 2011.

In 2018, the second season of AI Football GGO, officially called GGO Football 2: World Tournament, began airing in China.

Plot
In the 21st century, the relationship between sports and technology is getting closer to the point where human testing alone couldn't catch up with the greatly fluctuating standards. As more human footballers retire due to irrecoverable injuries, people start finding a way so everyone can still enjoy football games.  Among them, a research consultant only known as Professor GGO proposes an idea: a palm sized football robot with artificial intelligence. People are amused by the brilliant idea, and soon after, the development of the robots becomes the world's newest sensation.

Two years prior of the beginning of the series, Dr. Coleman, a technical consultant of GGO Football Association, set a counter strategy to stop his fellow biologist, Dr. Stan, from doing inhumane experiments for his own domination. However, while developing a new generation footballer programmed to cease Stan's plan, Professor GGO disappeared. Discovering this, Coleman split his research data and stored a half into the footballer, whose then he sent to Shanghai. He hoped that his good friend, Ball, could find a perfect person to "manage" the footballer and reach the World Tournament.

One day in Shanghai, Isaac accidentally found a footballer named Myth at Ball's seafood stall. He later discovered that Myth had a hard mission to carry. He was frustrated that his father didn't trust him and decided to prove himself by his skill. He decided to form a team with his classmates and start their pursuit into the tournament.

Characters

Barefoot
A competing team representing China in GGO National Tournament. They are the champion of GGO National Tournament this year. They also won the GGO Continental Tournament and obtain the qualification to participate in the GGO World Tournament. Team Captains are Isaac, Shawn, Karl, Timmy, Cat and later Oscar. Their football skills are varied, always keeping a balance between offense and defense. With great teamwork, they can always keep fighting until the end. They keep growing as one of the best teams in GGO Football. They don't have a special formation that they only use, but often vary depending on their opponent, and are both very flexible and creative in their tactics.

Controllers 
 Isaac: 13 years old, Shanghainese, in his first year of secondary school. He is the Overall Captain of team Barefoot and also the only child of Dr. Coleman, one of the three GGO Chief Designers. He lost his mother when he was very young, and grew up with his father and aunt. He inherited a love and talent for engineering and physics from his father, and he is a superb GGO controller. Like his dad, he likes wearing slippers. In GGO matches, he prefers playing offensively. He is a bit arrogant, often underestimates his rivals, but very determined to win. When his team are losing or being challenged hard, it is easy to see that he is quite anxious as he twirls a pen incessantly. When he comes across very strong opponents, he will often use strange and very creative ways to overcome the odds. Isaac is able to emerge victoriously. Controller of Team Barefoot's striker Myth.
 Shawn: 14 years old, half Italian half German, in 8th grade at an international school in Shanghai. He is a good-looking boy, comes from a family steeped in the arts. His father is a literary giant and his mother is a maestro conductor. Influenced by his parents, he has high expectations of his lifestyle. He is calm, does not often express what he really feels, and sometimes comes across wrongly as a proud, arrogant person. After meeting Barefoot's teammate, he is opened up a little bit. In GGO matches, he is a strong, steady defender. At every match, he always has a bottle of iced water nearby to help him think calmly – how much iced water depends on how good he thinks his opponents are. He is trying to know more about GGO Football and his parents preferred him to become a musician but when he saw Barefoot he preferred to play GGO Football. Controller of Team Barefoot's captain Nucleus and goalkeeper Shadow.
 Karl: 13 years old, Shanghainese, in first year at secondary school, he is also one of Isaac's childhood friends.as he's more closer to Timmy . He loves to take risks, has a gambler's personality, but never gambles money, only his fate. He always has a lucky coin with him – when he cannot decide on something, he will take out the coin and the issue will be settled by heads or tails. Karl is a bit short, in order to make himself stand out, his hairstyle and clothes are always quite loud. He is very quick-minded, open to change for working out new strategies. He is a loyal friend and always keeps his word. In GGO matches, Karl controls Satellite, Team Barefoot's winger – the perfect position for an opportunist.
 Timmy: 13 years old, Shanghainese, in first year at secondary school. He is a childhood friend of Isaac's and is a chubby little boy who is honest, responsible, and easily content. He eats a lot of hot dogs but Karl scolds him but he loves to eat more. He has his principles, works methodically, and does not like people who try to walk before they learn to crawl. Timmy loves hotdogs, and always carries ketchup, mustard and relish with him. He does not have much ambition and he just wants to go to university, but after entering the GGO competition and with Isaac's influence, he is beginning to think about what his life goals are. In GGO matches, he is a responsible and hardworking defender. He is not particularly talented and is a little insecure, but his hard work makes up for it. Because he is used to failure, he does not let it depress him, and in fact, he is always looking for lessons to be learnt in everything. Controller of Team Barefoot's defender Titan.
 Cat: 14 years old, Shanghainese, in first year at secondary school – she is a classmate of Isaac and his friends. She is a typical girl who likes to dress up and look pretty. She takes baking classes from Aunt Betty, Isaac's aunt, and at the same time she also absorbs Betty's quick-temper. She did not have much interest in GGO at first, proclaiming herself the manager of their GGO team and even buys a brand new GGO footballer. She works hard to learn more about GGO football as she has a crush in Shawn too. Controller of Team Barefoot's Sweeper Swift.
 Oscar: 13 years old, Shanghainese, in first year of secondary school. Was originally part of Team Protector, but when Shawn went back to Vienna at the end of the 4 Nations Charity Tournament he joined Team Barefoot to compete with them in the GGO World Cup Qualifying to play against teams of Asia, in Shawn's place. He lacked confidence and always worries to drag his brothers down when he was with Team Protector but has since turned to be a calm and defensive controller. Controller of Team Barefoot's Goalkeeper Shield.

Footballers 
 Myth: Striker of Team Barefoot, number 11. Extremely skillful at threading the ball, he is very adept at faking moves to get past his opponents, his scoring angles are extremely precise. Because he is the latest version of GGO Footballer, there are times when his AI system does not function properly. The groundbreaking element is that he has his own emotions, but in times of crisis, Myth is able to step up and play at a higher level than the rest. This is something that resembles Isaac very much. Special skills are the Accelerate Dribble, Subsonic Dribble, Roaring flame Strike, Radiant Roaring Flame Strike and Vacuum Zero Strike, Revival Block, Maximum Zero Strike (note: these moves were never seen until they played against Team Bio).
 Satellite: Winger of Team Barefoot, number 7. Super fast, remarkably accurate passing, loves to use complicated footwork that throws off his opponents. With so much understanding between himself and his teammates, he is often able to fool the opponents. Special skills are the Gravity Dribble, Satellite Orbit Dribble, and the Gravity Bulldozer Tackle, a skill he uses with Titan.
 Swift: Sweeper of Team Barefoot, number 18. He is not very strong in terms of fitness, but very quick in acceleration, one of the quickest GGO footballers in Shanghai. He often makes great steals on the pitch and therefore is known as the "Pitch Pickpocket". He does not seem to be a very focused footballer usually, but when he gets serious, he has the determination and will of steel. Special skills are the Dashing Dribble, Pass Particle Spin and the Zero Degrees Strike. Swift a anti-social ggo footballer, He doesn’t talk a lot with the other ggo footballers of his team.
 Nucleus: Captain and Defensive Midfielder of Team Barefoot, number 10. He is an all rounded midfielder with equal ability to attack and defend. He is captain of the Team Barefoot and is the key holding midfielder. Calm, persevering, with very strong leadership skills and an ability to make peace between quarrelling teammates. Special skills are the Omni Directional Dribble, Omni Directional Strike and Omni Directional Tackle.
 Titan: Center Back of Team Barefoot, number 4. Big, strong, tall and yet very quick on his feet (this is one of the factors that Timmy places most importance on as, in real life, Timmy himself is rather clumsy on his feet). Particularly good at getting in the right physical spot in both attack and defense, and with superior header skills. He is a 100% committed and responsible footballer. Special skills are the Bulldozer Tackle, Cruiser Tackle, Cruise Missile Strike and the Gravity Bulldozer Tackle, a skill he uses with Satellite.
 Shadow: Goalkeeper of Team Barefoot, number 1. He has excellent strength in jumps, reacts exceedingly quickly, and most importantly he is able to read the game very well. Although he comes off as very stubborn, he always listens and defers to Shawn's judgement. He has never once argued with Shawn. His special skill is the Shadow Save.
 Shield: Goalkeeper of Team Barefoot, number 12. When he joined Team Barefoot at first he wasn't very confident, but then showed determination and turned out to be a calm, accurate goalkeeper, something that resembled Oscar. His special skill is the God Shield Save.

Perseus
A competing team in GGO Regional Tournament. They created the 38-winning streak in GGO regional game. Team Captains are Shawn and Emmett.

Controllers
 Emmett: 14 years old, Controller of Cobra, Mustang and Glide. He is confident and strong adaptability. He is a good friend and partner with Shawn and they created the 38 winning streak in GGO regional game. After Shawn decides to join Isaac's team, Emmett returns to Germany and singlehandedly manages Team Perseus.

Footballers
 Cobra: Captain and Striker/Winger of Team Perseus, number 11.
 Nucleus: Defensive midfielder of Team Perseus, number 10.
 Mustang: Centre back of Team Perseus, number 5.
 Glide: Centre back of Team Perseus, number 4.
 Shadow: Goalkeeper of Team Perseus, number 1

Mirror
GGO China National Tournament semi-finalist. Team Captain is Mike. Their football skills are flexible and well coordinated. Their excellent teamwork and execution of strategies always destroy the opponent's defense. Well known for their Illusion Attack Formation.

Controller
 Mike (连城): The Captain of Team Mirror. He has a clear mind and strong will in GGO Football. Controller of all the Team Mirror's players.

Footballers
 Leader (雷霆): Captain and Striker of Team Mirror, number 10. His special skills are Vortex Strike and Vortex Pass.
 Skynet (天网): Winger of Team Mirror, number 9. His special skills are Vortex Strike and Vortex Pass.
 Spin (旋风): Midfielder of Team Mirror, number 8. His special skills are Vortex Strike and Vortex Pass.
 Blast (迅雷): Centre back of Team Mirror, number 3. His special skills are Vortex Strike and Vortex Pass.
 Reflex (反射): Goalkeeper of Team Mirror, number 1. A decent Goalkeeper with good goalkeeping skills.

Hornet
A competing team in the GGO National Tournament. Team Captains are Philip and Van - Father and Son. Their fast movements in the game are like a swarm of bees. Specializes in the Swarm Triangle Formation.

Controllers
 Philip (聂天高): One of the controllers of Team Hornet. He participates in GGO Football Tournament to find his missing son, Van. Controller of all the Team Hornet's players.
 Van (聂小华): One of the controllers of Team Hornet. He runs away from home because his father does not allow him to play GGO Football. Controller of all the Team Hornet's players.

Footballers
 Sprint (冲锋): Captain and Striker of Team Hornet, number 3. Good at beating the defender with his speed. Cooperates well with the other Hornets, Blade and Jet. His special skills are Double Shadow Swarm Attack and Treble Shadow Swarm Attack.
 Blade (冷锋): Winger of Team Hornet, number 6. Good at beating the defender with his speed. Cooperates well with the other Hornet's striker, Sprint and Jet. His special skill is Double Shadow Swarm Attack.
 Jet (破锋): Winger of Team Hornet, number 9. Good at beating the defender with his speed. Cooperates well with the other Hornet's striker, Sprint and Blade. His special skill is Double Shadow Swarm Attack.
 Needle (刺针): Centre Back of Team Hornet, number 5. A decent Centre Back with good defensive skill. His special skill is Hornet Sting Tackle.
 Hive (蜂巢): Goalkeeper of Team Hornet, number 1.

Protector
A competing team in the GGO National Tournament. Team Captains are the five Yang Brothers, the oldest four being quadruplets. They are good at defense and counter-attack. Special skills are Absolute Defense and Mid-Air Tactics.

Controllers
 Marcus (杨文): One of the controllers of Team Protector. He loves his brothers and does not allow anyone to speak ill of his brother, Oscar. Controller of all the Team Protector's players except Oscar's player Shield.
 Justus (杨武): One of the controllers of Team Protector. He loves his brothers and does not allow anyone to speak ill of his brother, Oscar. Controller of all the Team Protector's players except Oscar's player Shield.
 Rufus (杨英): One of the controllers of Team Protector. He loves his brothers and does not allow anyone to speak ill of his brother, Oscar. Controller of all the Team Protector's players except Oscar's player Shield.
 Cyrus (杨杰): One of the controllers of Team Protector. He loves his brothers and does not allow anyone to speak ill of his brother, Oscar. Controller of all the Team Protector's players except Oscar's player Shield.
 Oscar (杨聪):Controller the player Shield.[8]

Footballers
 Highlander (空中霸王): Captain and Attacking Midfielder of Team Protector, number 10. Responsible for scoring. Good at personal techniques and beating the defender with his speed.
 Invincible (御军): Centre Back of Team Protector, number 4. Cooperates well with the other Protectors defender, Damage and Stopper. Good at defensive skill to strive for victory.
 Damage (破裂): Centre Back of Team Protector, number 5. Cooperates well with the other Protectors defender, Invincible and Stopper. Good at defensive skill to strive for victory.
 Stopper (截击): Centre Back of Team Protector, number 6. Cooperates well with the other Protectors defender, Invincible and Damage. Good at defensive skill to strive for victory.
 Blocker (封阻): Goalkeeper of Team Protector, number 17. A decent replacement player of Shield.
 Shield (战盾): Goalkeeper of Team Protector, number 1. His special skill is the God Shield Save.

Magical Illusion
A competing team knocked out in the round of 16 in the China GGO National Tournament by Barefoot. Team Captains are William and Willy. Their football skills are aggressive. In order to win, they always use foul strategies without hesitation. One player would block the electronic referee's view and another player would foul the opponent. Although there are three electronic referees in a game the other two haven't got a wide enough camera to see the foul and give a yellow or red card.

Controllers
 William (威廉): Magician, one of the Controllers of Team Magical Illusion. He is determined to win in any way, especially fouls. Controller of all the Team Magical Illusion's players.
 Willy (威利): Magician, one of the Controllers of Team Magical Illusion. He is determined to win in any way, especially fouls. Controller of all the Team Magical Illusion's players.

Footballers
 Flint (火石): Winger and captain of Team Magical Illusion, number 6. Good at blocking opponents' attack by professional foul. His special skill is Sparkling Strike.
 Sparks (火花): Winger of Team Magical Illusion, number 9. Good at blocking opponents' attack by professional foul. His special skill is Sparkling Strike.
 Bomber (轰炸): Centre Back of Team Magical Illusion, number 11. Good at blocking opponents' attack by professional foul.
 Mess (毁坏): Centre Back of Team Magical Illusion, number 2. Good at blocking opponents' attack by professional foul.
 Wizard (巫师): Goalkeeper of Team Magical Illusion, number 1. A decent Goalkeeper with good goalkeeping skills.

Sky-Wheels
GGO National Tournament quarter-finalist, knocked out by Team Barefoot. Team Captains are Carmen and Nicholas. They persist in scoring even when they are trailing.

Controllers
 Carmen (卓凤): 15 years old, since her father died, she has taken care of her younger brother by herself. She joins the GGO national tournament for the prize money, so that she can continue to run the cart noodle stall which is the legacy of her father.
 Nicholas (卓龙): 13 years old, the main controller of Team Sky-wheels. He enjoys being alone. He is good at dealing with adversity and always keeps calm during matches.

Footballers
 Clone (复刻): Captain and Striker of Team Sky-wheels, number 10. An important member in the team who's responsible to score in match. His special skill is cloning, learning from the opponents, an eye for an eye. Although he can clone any special skill he still runs out of energy.
 Seep (渗透): Winger of Team Sky-wheels, number 11.
 Hawk (猎鹰): Winger of Team Sky-wheels, number 9.
 Axe (战斧): Centre back of Team Sky-wheels, number 2.
 Mask (铁面): Goalkeeper of Team Sky-wheels, number 1.

Wolf Army
GGO National Tournament semi-finalist, knocked out by Team Barefoot. Champion of the last GGO National Tournament. Team Captains are General Clark, Major General Paul and Major Given. As the name suggests, the team is as disciplined as an army and as savage as a wolf. Well known for their Normandy Formation and Sniper Track Formation.

Controllers
 General Clark (古勒上将): 45 years old, Veteran, the controller of Team Wolf Army. He has 6 years experience in playing GGO Football. National champion of last year.
 Major General Paul (保罗少将): 33 years old, Veteran, the controller of Team Wolf Army. He has 6 years experience in playing GGO Football.
 Major Given (基荣少校): 23 years old, Veteran, the controller of Team Wolf Army. He has 6 years experience in playing GGO Football.

Footballers
 Cannon (重炮): Captain and Sweeper of Team Wolf Army, number 10. His special skill is the Sniper Strike, shooting a football like a bullet.
 Missile (导弹): Sweeper of Team Wolf Army, number 8. His special skill is the Missile Strike, attacking from the air.
 Torpedo (鱼雷): Sweeper of Team Wolf Army, number 5. His special skill is the Torpedo Strike, changing the direction while shooting.
 Trinity (司令): Midfielder of Team Wolf Army, number 9. His special skill is the Sniper Track, finding the best shooting angle for his teammates.
 Radar (雷达): Goalkeeper of Team Wolf Army, number 1.

The Name of Devils
GGO National Tournament finalist. Runners up to Team Barefoot. Team Captains are Tyrant and his four assistants. Their football skills already meet the world-class standard. After the Devil's training, all the footballers are technically and physically far better than normal footballers.

Controllers
 Tyrant (烈巴男爵): 17 years old, leader of Team The Name of Devils team, English nobility. Tyrant is disdainful of school – instead he receives personal tutoring in his castle. Never seen without his shades, he has a cold half-smile that can chill one's heart and he never lets anyone know what he is thinking. Tyrant has a mean, sinister personality – he will do anything to win and never lets up against his opponents. He strongly believes that everything in the world can be bought. In GGO matches, Tyrant is an all-round controller, his defense and offence are equally strong. In terms of his GGO controlling skills, he is the best, even better than both Isaac and Shawn. The four guys who work under him to form the team were all bought for a high price. None of them have names but numbers that Tyrant gave to them.
 Laurie/010 (霍雷特/010): One of the controllers of Team The Name of Devils, controller of Darkness & Prosecutor. Ex-controller of Shadow. He was bought by Tyrant by a high price and named 010. He is very arrogant and thinks his orders are never wrong. Once in a friendly against Shawn's old team Perseus he was 4-0 up. But in the last minute Nucleus was through on goal and Laurie told Shadow, who was with Laurie at that time, to go and smother the ball. Shadow thought Nucleus was going to pass so he hesitated. Laurie still told Shadow to go out but when he did Nucleus passed and Cobra made it 4–1 in the last second. Shawn told Laurie that if he hadn't told Shadow to leave his goal then they would have won 4–0. Laurie insisted that it was Shadow's fault and that his orders were never wrong and threw Shadow against a wall, damaging his left eye, and left. Shawn picked Shadow up, took him home, fixed his eye as well as he could and the two have never been apart in any GGO match.
 91 (91): One of the controllers of Team The Name of Devils, controller of Destroyer. He works under Tyrant and he gave the number 91 to him.
 13 (13): One of the controllers of Team The Name of Devils, controller of Cracker. He works under Tyrant and he gave the number 13 to him.
 66 (66): One of the controllers of Team The Name of Devils, controller of Exterminate. He works under Tyrant and he gave the number 66 to him.

Footballers
 Darkness (黑帝): Striker of Team The Name of Devils, number 0. All-rounded technique, possessing the best fitness and technical skill in the all of Shanghai.
 Cracker (爆破): Winger of Team The Name of Devils, number 13. Second fastest player in Shanghai, only losing to Team Barefoot's Swift and named The King of Dribbling.
 Exterminate (歼灭): Captain and Defensive midfielder of Team The Name of Devils, number 66. .
 Destroyer (破坏): Centre back of Team The Name of Devils, number 29. Big and tall but also extremely quick, his accurate and ruthless defense work successfully stops his opponents.
 Prosecutor (盖世太保): Goalkeeper of Team The Name of Devils, number 1. Great saving skills, can easily save any types of goals.

Samba
Brazil's Team Samba, champions of the world three times in a row and are probably the best GGO team in the world. Their football skills are world class defensively and offensively.

Controllers
 Dimero（迪美奥）: 14 years old, the main controller of Brazil's Team Samba, a professional footballer. He has 3 years' experience in playing GGO. Controller of Striker Extreme and keeper Twister.
 Gardo（加度）: 15 years old, controller of Brazil's Team Samba, a professional footballer. He has 3 years' experience in playing GGO. Controller of Midfielders Synchronizer and Freezer.
 Neo（里奥）: 15 years old, controller of Brazil's Team Samba, a professional footballer. He has 3 years' experience in playing GGO. Controller of Centre Back Steel

Footballers
 Extreme（无极）: Captain and Striker of Brazil's Team Samba, number 9. Having played in numerous big games, he has matured into one of the cleverest footballers. His special skills are the Projective Bouncing Strike, Shadow Windbreaking Strike, Lobster-tail Bicycle Kick, Samba magic pass and Samba Banana Strike. His attributes are top class, whether it is dribbling skills, shot accuracy, dribbling speed or body balance. He is one of the brightest stars in GGO Football.
 Synchronizer（圣极龙）: Midfielder of Team Samba, number 10. His special skill is the flaming dragon dribble.
 Freezer（飞沙）: Midfielder of Team Samba, number 20. His special skill is the Samba magic pass, Sandstorm Tackle, Sandstorm Dribble, Brurock Strike .
 Steel（钢铁）: Centre Back of Brazil's Team Samba, number 6. His special skills are the Samba Magic Pass and Immediate Counter-offensive Tackle, Faster Tackle. Although playing as a defender, his dribbling skills are one of the best.
 Twister（龙卷）: Goalkeeper of Brazil's Team Samba, number 00. Although he has only got one arm, his Tornado spinning save is an exceptional goalkeeping skill.

Lions
A competing team representing England in GGO International Challenge Cup. Finalist of the last GGO World Tournament. Team Captains are Nelson and Barth. Their football skills are solid and well coordinated. They specialize in using data and statistics to estimate opponents' next actions. Famous for their "Crescent Wall Formation" and "Mirror Crescent Wall Formation.

Controllers
 Nelson（尼尔逊）: 47 years old, one of the controllers of England's Team Lions, a former football player. He has 7 years' experience in playing GGO Football.
 Barth（巴菲斯）: 40 years old, one of the controllers of England's Team Lions. He has 7 years' experience in playing GGO Football.

Footballers
 Roar（狮吼）: Captain and Striker of England's Team Lions, number 9. His special skills are the Crescent Pass, Inner Crescent Strike, Crescent Tackle and Crescent Strike.
 Meniscus（新月）: Midfielder of England's Team Lions, number 23. His special skills are the Crescent Pass.
 Arrow（穿云箭）: Winger of England's Team Lions, number 7. His special skills are the Crescent Pass, Crescent Swinging Tackle and Plenilune Swinging Tackle.
 Fort（城堡）: Centre Back of England's Team Lions, number 5. His special skills are the Crescent Swinging Tackle, Outer Crescent Strike and Crescent Strike.
 Rock（金汤）: Goalkeeper of England's Team Lions, number 1. His special moves are the Crescent Pass and Crescent Save.

Tango
A competing team representing Argentina in GGO International Challenge Cup. Team Captain is Consalis. Their football skills seem gentle but actually powerful. They always attack smoothly with cooperation. Specialize in Tango Rose Formation and Blooming Rose Formation.

Controller
 Consalis（干沙利斯）: The controller of Argentina's Team Tango. He is a confident dancer and a perfectionist. Anything not perfect he would either do again to make perfect or throw away.

Footballers
 Centron（核心）: Striker of Argentina's Team Tango, number 10. He is the heart of the Argentina team. He is the architect of all of the team's offensive and defensive moves. He is the perfect footballer with no flaw, whether it's skills, lower body power, power or offensive and defensive awareness. His special skills are the Poison Ivy Tackle, Rose Dribble and Pollen Strike.
 Dagger（尖刀）: Captain and Attacking Midfielder of Argentina's Team Tango, number 11. His special skills are the Poison Ivy Tackle and Poison Ivy Pass.
 Red Sword（恕剑）: Defensive midfielder of Argentina's Team Tango, number 4. His special skills are the Poison Ivy Tackle and Poison Ivy Pass.
 Vine（蔓藤）: Wing Back of Argentina's Team Tango, number 3. His special skills are the Poison Ivy Tackle and Poison Ivy Pass.
 Thorn（荆棘）: Goalkeeper of Argentina's Team Tango, number 1.

Birds
A competing team representing Japan in GGO Continental Tournament. They have continually obtained the qualification in the GGO World Tournament for eight years. Team Captains are Hatori and Hasegawa. Players are good at offensive skills.

Controllers
 Hatori（火野雄一）: 30 years old, one of the controllers of Japan's Team Birds. He was a kendo coach and he has 12 years' experience in playing GGO Football.
 Hasegawa（渡三郎）: 13-year-old student, one of the controllers of Japan's Team Birds. He has 2 years' experience in playing GGO Football.

Footballers
 Claw（鹰爪）: Striker of Japan's Team Birds, number 9. His special skill is the Eagles Strike.
 Phoenix（凤凰）: Winger of Japan's Team Birds, number 7. His special skill is the Eagles Strike.
 Jetfire（天火）: Winger of Japan's Team Birds, number 12. His special skill is the Eagles Strike.
 Falcon（隼）: Captain and Free Role of Japan's Team Birds, number 10. His special skills are the Falcon Wings Tackle, Falcon Gliding Pass, Kendo Dual Tackle and Eagles Strike. Known as the best all-rounder, contributes to both offense and defense.
 Iron Wing（铁羽）: Goalkeeper of Japan's Team Birds, number 1.

Dohago
A competing team representing Singapore in GGO Continental Tournament. Team Captain is Louis. An offensive team but relatively weak in defense. Famous for their Fire Lion Claw Attack Formation.

Controller
 Louis（范帅）: 28 years old, Tailor, the controller of Team Dohago. He has 3 years' experience in playing GGO Football.

Footballers
 Erosion（侵蚀）: Striker of Team Dohago, number 5. Attack from the air with Thunder to double the power.
 Thunder（悍雷）: Striker of Team Dohago, number 4. Attack from the air with Erosion to double the power.
 Electrolyte（电极）: Captain and Midfielder of Team Dohago, number 10. His special skill Lion Claw Tackle, blocking opponents from going forward.
 Flame（火焰）: Centre Back of Team Dohago, number 3.
 Sealer（冻结）: Goalkeeper of Team Dohago, number 1.

Sura
A competing team representing a mysterious island in Asia in GGO Continental Tournament. Team Captain is Alpha Hart, later revealed to actually be Nicholas, the Ex-Controller of team Sky Wheels when he takes off his mask. Every member of the team wears a mask. Thus, no one knows the genuine identity of the team. Specializes in Sura devil Formation.

Controller
 Alpha Hart/Nicholas（阿力步化哈慈/卓龙）: No one knows the real identity of this controller. Only little information showing that he comes from a mysterious island in Asia, later revealed to be one of the controllers knocked out by Barefoot in the China National GGO tournament in the quarter finals.

Footballers
 Clone（复刻）: Captain and Striker of Team Sura, number 10. Mainly responsible for scoring. His special skill is the Sura Devil Strike, later the Sura Roaring Flame Devil Strike when he clones the Roaring Flame Strike from Myth. He also leads the Sura Devil Formation. A former player in Team Sky-Wheels.
 Dark Satellite（克隆流星）: Winger of Team Sura, number 7. A duplicated version of Satellite in Team Barefoot. Can clone any skill that Satellite does.
 Dark Swift（克隆疾电）: Sweeper of Team Sura, number 18. A duplicated version of Swift in Team Barefoot. Can clone any skill that Swift does.
 Dark Titan（克隆铁甲）: Centre Back of Team Sura, number 4. A duplicated version of Titan in Team Barefoot. Can clone any skill that Titan does.
 Dark Nucleus（克隆核能）: Defensive Midfielder of Team Sura, number 0. A duplicated version of Nucleus in Team Barefoot. Can clone any skill that Nucleus does.
 Dark Shield（克隆战盾）: Goalkeeper of Team Sura, number 1. A duplicated version of Shield in Team Barefoot. Can clone any skill that Shield does.
 Dark Shadow（克隆影眼）: Goalkeeper of Team Sura, number 88. A duplicated version of Shadow in Team Barefoot. Can clone any skill that Shadow does.

Seasons

Season 1

Season 2

Overseas broadcast
The original firework lit up the sky of Hangzhou in the evening of April 28. The 6th China International Cartoon and Animation Festival, which is the most eye-catching and popular cartoon festival in China, opened in Hangzhou Huanglong Stadium.

AI Football GGO premiered in the Philippines premiered on July 20, 2010, on Hero TV and in India in Malayalam in April 2020. An English dub debuted in South Africa on July 10, 2010, on e.tv. In Singapore, Okto began airing the show in May 2012. The series ran between October 6, 2013, and April 5, 2014, on Eleven in Australia. In the United States, the show debuted on Primo TV alongside the channel's launch in January 2017. The second season debuted in April 2020. The first season began streaming on Tubi TV in Canada and the United States on September 12, 2020.

References

External links
 Official Website (English)

2010 Chinese television series debuts
2010s animated television series
Chinese children's animated comedy television series
Animated sports television series
Association football television series